Phenacorhamdia is a genus of three-barbeled catfishes native to tropical South America.

Species
There are currently 11 recognized species in this genus:
 Phenacorhamdia anisura (Mees, 1987)
 Phenacorhamdia boliviana (N. E. Pearson, 1924)
 Phenacorhamdia hoehnei (A. Miranda-Ribeiro, 1914)
 Phenacorhamdia macarenensis Dahl, 1961
 Phenacorhamdia nigrolineata Zarske, 1998
 Phenacorhamdia provenzanoi DoNascimiento & Milani, 2008
Phenacorhamdia roxoi Silva, 2020
 Phenacorhamdia somnians (Mees, 1974)
 Phenacorhamdia taphorni DoNascimiento & Milani, 2008
 Phenacorhamdia tenebrosa (Schubart, 1964)
 Phenacorhamdia unifasciata Britski, 1993

References

Heptapteridae
Taxa named by Georg Dahl
Fish of South America
Catfish genera
Freshwater fish genera